The 1990 Fremantle state by-election was a by-election held on 26 May 1990 for the Western Australian Legislative Assembly seat of Fremantle. The election occurred on the same day as the 1990 Maylands state by-election.

The by-election was triggered by the resignation of Labor member and former Deputy Premier David Parker on 26 April 1990.

The seat of Fremantle, first established in 1890, was considered to be a safe seat for the Labor Party.

Timeline

Candidates 
The by-election attracted eleven candidates. Of these, four were notable—Jim McGinty, the Labor candidate, was the secretary of the Miscellaneous Workers' Union. Arthur Marshall, the Liberal candidate, was a veteran sports commentator for the Seven Network who had also founded a tennis academy. Christabel Chamarette, for the new Greens WA party, was a psychologist and social worker. John Troy was the former Labor member for the seat from 1977 to 1980.

Results
Jim McGinty held the seat for the Labor Party. Despite winning the seat comfortably, his votes trailed those of the Liberal candidate by several hundred votes until the tenth count, when the Greens preferences and through them the majority of John Troy's preferences were distributed.

References 

Fremantle state by-election
Western Australian state by-elections
Fremantle state by-election, 1990
Fremantle state by-election
History of Fremantle